ABC 5 may refer to:


United States
ABC 5, one of the following television stations affiliated with the American Broadcasting Company:

Current
KECY-DT2, El Centro, California / Yuma, Arizona (cable channel, broadcasts on channel 9.2)
KFBB-TV, Great Falls, Montana
KOCO-TV, Oklahoma City, Oklahoma
KRGV-TV, Weslaco / Brownsville / McAllen / Harlingen, Texas
KSTP-TV, St. Paul / Minneapolis, Minnesota
WCVB-TV, Boston, Massachusetts
WEWS-TV, Cleveland, Ohio
WOI-DT,  Ames-Des Moines, Iowa
WORA-TV, Mayagüez, Puerto Rico

Former
KORN/KXON/KDLT-TV, Sioux Falls, South Dakota (1969 to 1983)
WFRV-TV, Green Bay, Wisconsin (1953 to 1959 and again from 1983 to 1992)
KCTV, Kansas City, Missouri (1953 to 1955)
WRAL-TV, Raleigh / Durham, North Carolina (1957 to 1985)
KING-TV in Seattle, Washington (1953 to 1959)

Philippines
ABC 5, a former name of Philippine TV network TV5 owned by TV5 Network Inc.